Gideon van Wyk (born ) is a South African rugby union player for the  and .He also plays for the Houston SaberCats in Major League Rugby (MLR). His regular position is flanker.

Van Wyk was named in the  squad for the 2021 Currie Cup Premier Division.

References

South African rugby union players
Living people
2001 births
Rugby union flankers
Free State Cheetahs players
Cheetahs (rugby union) players
Houston SaberCats players